Sinogastromyzon chapaensis is a species of ray-finned fish in the genus Sinogastromyzon. It is endemic to the Red River drainage in northern Vietnam and Hunan, southern China.  Very little is known about ecology of this species living in rivers.

References

Sinogastromyzon
Freshwater fish of China
Fish of Vietnam
Hong River
Fish described in 1978